Adolf Lu Hitler Rangsa Marak (born ) is an Indian politician of the Nationalist Congress Party who served as an environment and later cooperation minister until 2003 in the Government of Meghalaya.

Biography
A member of the Nationalist Congress Party, he served as forest and environment minister in the government of E. K. Mawlong. He later served as cooperation minister under Chief Minister Flinder Anderson Khonglam. 

He lost his seat in the state assembly following the February 2003 elections. On June 27, 2003, he was arrested on charges of maintaining links with the banned militant group Achik National Volunteers' Council.  He was released on bail about a month later. The following year he lost the Garo Hills District Council election for the Dengnakpara G.D.C. constituency to Roster Sangma of the Congress. He lost the 2003 legislative election by just over 300 votes to Zenith Sangma.  However, he reemerged as the victor in the 2008 legislative elections.

Name
In regard to his controversial name, Hitler Marak told the Hindustan Times: "Maybe my parents liked the name and hence christened me Hitler... I am happy with my name, although I don't have any dictatorial tendencies". In February 2013 it was widely reported in international media that Marak would be running again for the state assembly in Meghalaya, against some other oddly-named candidates, such as Frankenstein Momin and Billykid Sangma.

References

External links
 Voting for Frankenstein - BBC News article mentioning Marak
 CNN Article mentioning Marak

Living people
Meghalaya politicians
1950s births
Nationalist Congress Party politicians from Meghalaya
People from West Garo Hills district
Garo people